A ballpoint pen, also known as a biro (British English), ball pen (Hong Kong, Indian and Philippine English), or dot pen (Nepali) is a pen that dispenses ink (usually in paste form) over a metal ball at its point, i.e. over a "ball point". The metal commonly used is steel, brass, or tungsten carbide. The design was conceived and developed as a cleaner and more reliable alternative to dip pens and fountain pens, and it is now the world's most-used writing instrument; millions are manufactured and sold daily. It has influenced art and graphic design and spawned an artwork genre.

Some pen manufacturers produce designer ballpoint pens for the high-end and collectors' markets.

History

Origins

The concept of using a "ball point" within a writing instrument to apply ink to paper has existed since the late 19th century. In these inventions, the ink was placed in a thin tube whose end was blocked by a tiny ball, held so that it could not slip into the tube or fall out of the pen.

The first patent for a ballpoint pen was issued on 30 October 1888 to John J. Loud, who was attempting to make a writing instrument that would be able to write "on rough surfaces—such as wood, coarse wrapping-paper, and other articles" which fountain pens could not. Loud's pen had a small rotating steel ball held in place by a socket. Although it could be used to mark rough surfaces such as leather, as Loud intended, it proved too coarse for letter-writing. With no commercial viability, its potential went unexploited, and the patent eventually lapsed.

The manufacture of economical, reliable ballpoint pens as are known today arose from experimentation, modern chemistry, and precision manufacturing capabilities of the early 20th century. Patents filed worldwide during early development are testaments to failed attempts at making the pens commercially viable and widely available. Early ballpoints did not deliver the ink evenly; overflow and clogging were among the obstacles inventors faced toward developing reliable ballpoint pens. If the ball socket were too tight or the ink too thick, it would not reach the paper. If the socket were too loose or the ink too thin, the pen would leak, or the ink would smear. Ink reservoirs pressurized by a piston, spring, capillary action, and gravity would all serve as solutions to ink-delivery and flow problems.

László Bíró, a Hungarian newspaper editor (later naturalized Argentine) frustrated by the amount of time that he wasted filling up fountain pens and cleaning up smudged pages, noticed that inks used in newspaper printing dried quickly, leaving the paper dry and smudge-free. He decided to create a pen using the same type of ink. Bíró enlisted the help of his brother György, a dentist with useful knowledge of chemistry, to develop viscous ink formulae for new ballpoint designs.

Bíró's innovation successfully coupled ink-viscosity with a ball-socket mechanism which acted compatibly to prevent ink from drying inside the reservoir while allowing controlled flow. Bíró filed a British patent on 15 June 1938.

In 1941, the Bíró brothers and a friend, Juan Jorge Meyne, fled Germany and moved to Argentina, where they formed "Bíró Pens of Argentina" and filed a new patent in 1943. Their pen was sold in Argentina as the "Birome" from the names Bíró and Meyne, which is how ballpoint pens are still known in that country. This new design was licensed by the British engineer Frederick George Miles and manufactured by his company Miles Aircraft, to be used by Royal Air Force aircrew as the "Biro". Ballpoint pens were found to be more versatile than fountain pens, especially at high altitudes, where fountain pens were prone to leak.

Bíró's patent, and other early patents on ballpoint pens, often used the term "ball-point fountain pen".

Postwar proliferation

Following World War II, many companies vied to commercially produce their own ballpoint pen design. In pre-war Argentina, success of the Birome ballpoint was limited, but in mid-1945, the Eversharp Co., a maker of mechanical pencils, teamed up with Eberhard Faber Co. to license the rights from Birome for sales in the United States.

In 1946, a Catalan firm, Vila Sivill Hermanos, began to make a ballpoint, Regia Continua, and from 1953 to 1957 their factory also made Bic ballpoints, on contract with the French firm   Société Bic.

During the same period, American entrepreneur Milton Reynolds came across a Birome ballpoint pen during a business trip to Buenos Aires, Argentina. Recognizing commercial potential, he purchased several ballpoint samples, returned to the United States, and founded the Reynolds International Pen Company. Reynolds bypassed the Birome patent with sufficient design alterations to obtain an American patent, beating Eversharp and other competitors to introduce the pen to the US market. Debuting at Gimbels department store in New York City on 29 October 1945, for US$12.50 each (1945 US dollar value, about $ in  dollars), "Reynolds Rocket" became the first commercially successful ballpoint pen. Reynolds went to great extremes to market the pen, with great success; Gimbel's sold many thousands of pens within one week. In Britain, the Miles Martin pen company was producing the first commercially successful ballpoint pens there by the end of 1945.

Neither Reynolds' nor Eversharp's ballpoint lived up to consumer expectations in America. Ballpoint pen sales peaked in 1946, and consumer interest subsequently plunged due to market saturation. By the early 1950s the ballpoint boom had subsided and Reynolds' company folded.

Paper Mate pens, among the emerging ballpoint brands of the 1950s, bought the rights to distribute their own ballpoint pens in Canada. Facing concerns about ink-reliability, Paper Mate pioneered new ink formulas and advertised them as "banker-approved". In 1954, Parker Pens released "The Jotter"—the company's first ballpoint—boasting additional features and technological advances which also included the use of tungsten-carbide textured ball-bearings in their pens. In less than a year, Parker sold several million pens at prices between three and nine dollars. In the 1960s, the failing Eversharp Co. sold its pen division to Parker and ultimately folded.

Marcel Bich also introduced a ballpoint pen to the American marketplace in the 1950s, licensed from Bíró and based on the Argentine designs. Bich shortened his name to Bic in 1953, forming the ballpoint brand Bic now recognized globally. Bic pens struggled until the company launched its "Writes The First Time, Every Time!" advertising campaign in the 1960s. Competition during this era forced unit prices to drop considerably.

Inks
Ballpoint pen ink is normally a paste containing around 25 to 40 percent dye. The dyes are suspended in a mixture of solvents and fatty acids. The most common of the solvents are benzyl alcohol or phenoxyethanol, which mix with the dyes and oils to create a smooth paste that dries quickly. The fatty acids help to lubricate the ball tip while writing. Hybrid inks also contain added lubricants in the ink to provide a smoother writing experience. The drying time of the ink varies depending upon the viscosity of the ink and the diameter of the ball.

In general, the more viscous the ink, the faster it will dry, but more writing pressure needs to be applied to dispense ink. But although they are less viscous, hybrid inks have a faster drying time compared to normal ballpoint inks. Also, a larger ball dispenses more ink and thus increases drying time.

The dyes used in blue and black ballpoint pens are basic dyes based on triarylmethane and acid dyes derived from diazo compounds or phthalocyanine. Common dyes in blue (and black) ink are Prussian blue, Victoria blue, methyl violet, crystal violet, and phthalocyanine blue. The dye eosin is commonly used for red ink.

The inks are resistant to water after drying but can be defaced by certain solvents which include acetone and various alcohols.

Types of ballpoint pens

Ballpoint pens are produced in both disposable and refillable models. Refills allow for the entire internal ink reservoir, including a ballpoint and socket, to be replaced. Such characteristics are usually associated with designer-type pens or those constructed of finer materials. The simplest types of ballpoint pens are disposable and have a cap to cover the tip when the pen is not in use, or a mechanism for retracting the tip, which varies between manufacturers but is usually a spring- or screw-mechanism.

Rollerball pens employ the same ballpoint mechanics, but with the use of water-based inks instead of oil-based inks. Compared to oil-based ballpoints, rollerball pens are said to provide more fluid ink-flow, but the water-based inks will blot if held stationary against the writing surface. Water-based inks also remain wet longer when freshly applied and are thus prone to "smearing"—posing problems to left-handed people (or right handed people writing right-to-left script)—and "running", should the writing surface become wet.

Some ballpoint pens use a hybrid ink formulation whose viscosity is lower than that of standard ballpoint ink, but greater than rollerball ink. The ink dries faster than a gel pen to prevent smearing when writing. These pens are better suited for left-handed persons. Examples are the Uni-ball Jetstream and Pilot Acroball ranges. These pens are also labelled "extra smooth", as they offer a smoother writing experience compared to normal ballpoint pens.

Because of a ballpoint pen's reliance on gravity to coat the ball with ink, most cannot be used to write upside-down. However, technology developed by Fisher pens in the United States resulted in the production of what came to be known as the "Fisher Space Pen". Space Pens combine a more viscous ink with a pressurized ink reservoir that forces the ink toward the point. Unlike standard ballpoints, the rear end of a Space Pen's pressurized reservoir is sealed, eliminating evaporation and leakage, thus allowing the pen to write upside-down, in zero-gravity environments, and reportedly underwater. Astronauts have made use of these pens in outer space.

Ballpoint pens with erasable ink were pioneered by the Paper Mate pen company. The ink formulas of erasable ballpoints have properties similar to rubber cement, allowing the ink to be literally rubbed clean from the writing surface before drying and eventually becoming permanent. Erasable ink is much thicker than standard ballpoint inks, requiring pressurized cartridges to facilitate inkflow—meaning they can also write upside-down. Though these pens are equipped with erasers, any eraser will suffice.

The inexpensive, disposable Bic Cristal (also simply "Bic pen" or "Biro") is reportedly the most widely sold pen in the world. It was the Bic company's first product and is still synonymous with the company name. The Bic Cristal is part of the permanent collection at the Museum of Modern Art in New York City, acknowledged for its industrial design. Its hexagonal barrel mimics that of a wooden pencil and is transparent, showing the ink level in the reservoir. Originally a sealed streamlined cap, the modern pen cap has a small hole at the top to meet safety standards, helping to prevent suffocation if children suck it into the throat.

Multi-pens are pens that feature multiple varying colored pen refills. Sometimes ballpoint refills are combined with another non-ballpoint refill, usually a mechanical pencil. Sometimes ballpoint pens combine a ballpoint tip on one end and touchscreen stylus on the other.

Ballpoint pens are sometimes provided free by businesses, such as hotels and banks, printed with a company's name and logo. Ballpoints have also been produced to commemorate events, such as a pen commemorating the 1963 assassination of President John F. Kennedy. These pens, known as "advertising pens," are the same as standard ballpoint pen models, but have become valued among collectors.

Sometimes ballpoint pens are also produced as design objects. With cases made of metal or wood, they become individually styled utility objects.

As art medium

Ballpoint pens have proven to be a versatile art medium for professional artists as well as amateur doodlers. Low cost, availability, and portability are cited by practitioners as qualities which make this common writing tool a convenient, alternative art supply. Some artists use them within mixed-media works, while others use them solely as their medium-of-choice.

Effects not generally associated with ballpoint pens can be achieved. Traditional pen-and-ink techniques such as stippling and cross-hatching can be used to create half-tones or the illusion of form and volume. For artists whose interests necessitate precision line-work, ballpoints are an obvious attraction; ballpoint pens allow for sharp lines not as effectively executed using a brush. Finely applied, the resulting imagery has been mistaken for airbrushed artwork and photography, causing reactions of disbelief which ballpoint artist Lennie Mace refers to as the "Wow Factor".

Famous 20th-century artists such as Andy Warhol, among others, have utilized ballpoint pens to some extent during their careers. Ballpoint pen artwork continues to attract interest in the 21st century, with contemporary artists gaining recognition for their specific use of ballpoint pens; for their technical proficiency, imagination, and innovation. Korean-American artist Il Lee has been creating large-scale, ballpoint-only abstract artwork since the late 1970s. Since the 1980s, Lennie Mace creates imaginative, ballpoint-only artwork of varying content and complexity, applied to unconventional surfaces including wood and denim. The artist coined terms such as "PENtings" and "Media Graffiti" to describe his varied output. More recently, British artist James Mylne has been creating photo-realistic artwork using mostly black ballpoints, sometimes with minimal mixed-media color.

Using ballpoint pens to create artwork is not without limitations. Color availability and sensitivity of ink to light are among concerns of ballpoint pen artists. Mistakes pose greater risks to ballpoint artists; once a line is drawn, it generally cannot be erased. Additionally, "blobbing" of ink on the drawing surface and "skipping" of ink-flow require consideration when using ballpoint pens for artistic purposes. Although the mechanics of ballpoint pens remain relatively unchanged, ink composition has evolved to solve certain problems over the years, resulting in unpredictable sensitivity to light and some extent of fading.

Manufacturing

Although designs and construction vary between brands, basic components of all ballpoint pens are universal. Standard components of a ballpoint tip include the freely rotating "ball" itself (distributing the ink on the writing surface), a "socket" holding the ball in place, small "ink channels" that provide ink to the ball through the socket, and a self-contained "ink reservoir" supplying ink to the ball. In modern disposable pens, narrow plastic tubes contain the ink, which is compelled downward to the ball by gravity. Brass, steel, or tungsten carbide are used to manufacture the ball bearing-like points, then housed in a brass socket.

The function of these components can be compared with the ball-applicator of roll-on antiperspirant; the same technology at a larger scale. The ballpoint tip delivers the ink to the writing surface while acting as a "buffer" between the ink in the reservoir and the air outside, preventing the quick-drying ink from drying inside the reservoir. Modern ballpoints are said to have a two-year shelf life, on average.

A ballpoint tip that can write comfortably for a long period of time is not easy to produce, as it requires high-precision machinery and thin high-grade steel alloy plates. China, which  produces about 80 percent of the world's ballpoint pens, relied on imported ballpoint tips and metal alloys before 2017.

The common ballpoint pen is a product of mass production, with components produced separately on assembly lines. Basic steps in the manufacturing process include the production of ink formulas, molding of metal and plastic components, and assembly. Marcel Bich (leading to Société Bic) was involved in developing the production of inexpensive ballpoint pens.

Standards
The International Organization for Standardization has published standards for ball point and roller ball pens:

 ISO 127561998: Drawing and writing instruments – Ball point pens – Vocabulary
 ISO 12757-11998: Ball point pens and refills – Part 1: General use
 ISO 12757-21998: Ball point pens and refills – Part 2: Documentary use (DOC)
 ISO 14145-11998: Roller ball pens and refills – Part 1: General use
 ISO 14145-21998: Roller ball pens and refills – Part 2: Documentary use (DOC)

Guinness World Records
 The world's largest functioning ballpoint pen was made by Acharya Makunuri Srinivasa in India.
 The world's most popular pen is Bic's Bic Cristal, the 100 billionth of which was sold in September 2006. It was launched in 1950 and has gone on to sell 57 per second, much faster and more than other brands.

See also
 Gel pen
 List of pen types, brands and companies
 Retractable pen
 Rollerball pen
 Ballpoint pen knife
 Ballpoint mouse

References

External links

 Fascinating facts about the invention of the Ballpoint Pen by Ladislas Biro in 1935
 Laszlo Biro on Jewish.hu's list of famous Hungarians

American inventions
Argentine inventions
Hungarian inventions
Pens